Phil Young is an Australian former rugby league footballer who played for the Canterbury Bulldogs and the Newtown Jets in the New South Wales Rugby League premiership competition.

Background
Young was born in Canterbury, New South Wales, Australia.

References 

1951 births
Living people
Australian rugby league players
Newtown Jets players
Canterbury-Bankstown Bulldogs players
Rugby league players from Sydney